Piazza d'Italia is a city square in Sassari, Italy.

Buildings around the square
Palazzo della Provincia, Sassari
Palazzo Giordano

Piazzas in Sardinia
Sassari